Mona Ghanem Al Marri (Arabic: منى غانم المري) is a government media official in the United Arab Emirates. 

In 2012, she was appointed as Director General of the Government of Dubai Media Office, a government entity responsible for managing the media affairs of Sheikh Mohammed bin Rashid Al Maktoum, the Ruler of Dubai, as well as Hamdan bin Mohammed Al Maktoum, the Crown Prince of Dubai, and Maktoum bin Mohammed Al Maktoum, the Deputy Ruler of Dubai. The Office manages relationships and coordination between the Government of Dubai and local and international media.

Early life  
In 1996, she started her career as a Media and PR Coordinator with the founding team of the Dubai Shopping Festival. In 1998, she took over the Dubai Summer Surprises, an initiative to attract visitors to Dubai during summer months.

Media career 
She is the Director General of the Government of Dubai Media Office. 

In 1999, Sheikh Mohammed bin Rashid Al Maktoum assigned Mona Al Marri to establish the Dubai Press Club. The Club contributes to positioning Dubai as a media and journalism hub and it's a platform for journalists and media professionals to discuss and deliberate political, economic and social issues. The Club also works to develop and support journalism on the local and regional levels through initiatives like the Arab Media Forum, the Arab Journalism Award, the Emirati Media Forum and the annual Arab Media Outlook report.

While leading the Dubai Press Club, Mona Al Marri launched the Arab Media Forum (AMF), which was inaugurated in 2001. As President of the Dubai Press Club, Mona Al Marri launched the Arab Journalism Award in 1999. The award is given each year by Sheikh Mohammed bin Rashid Al Maktoum during the Arab Media Forum.

Government of Dubai Media Office 
In 2012, she was appointed as Director General of the Government of Dubai Media Office, a government entity responsible for managing the media affairs of His Highness Sheikh Mohammed bin Rashid Al Maktoum the Ruler of Dubai, His Highness Hamdan bin Mohammed Al Maktoum the Crown Prince of Dubai and His Highness Maktoum bin Mohammed Al Maktoum the Deputy Ruler of Dubai; furthermore, the Office manages relationships and coordination between the Government of Dubai and local and international media.

References

Living people
Government of Dubai
Emirati businesspeople
Emirati women in business
People from Dubai
Year of birth missing (living people)